Cameron Bellamy is an endurance athlete from South Africa. He has broken numerous records including being one of six men on a team to row across the Drake Passage in 2019. He also broke the record for the longest ocean channel swim previously held by Chloe McCardel.

Early life and education
Bellamy grew up in Cape Town, South Africa. He attended the University of Queensland in Australia where he earned a Master's Degree.

Career
Bellamy began swimming at the age of 29.

In September 2019, Bellamy completed the longest ocean channel swim on record, making the  trip from Barbados to St Lucia in 56 hours and 36 minutes. The previous record was held by Chloe McCardel who completed a  trip approximately five years prior.

The rowers worked in 90-minute shifts for 24 hours a day, travelling . The trip was documented in real-time by the Discovery Channel in a multi-platform series documentary called The Impossible Row.

The goal was to complete the record set by Sarah Thomas of  set swimming across Lake Champlain in North America. The feat was put on hold due to the COVID-19 pandemic.

References

External links 
 Discovery Channel profile

Living people
University of Queensland alumni
South African male swimmers
South African male rowers
Year of birth missing (living people)
Sportspeople from Cape Town